The For U Tour was the second and last headlining concert tour by American boyband In Real Life, in support of their first studio album, She Do (2019). The tour began on October 2, 2019, in Cleveland, and concluded on October 29, 2019, in Seattle.

Background and development
On August 24, 2019, In Real Life announced they would be embarking on their second headlining tour. Dates were announced on August 26. Jenna Raine was announce as the opening act with Asher Angel and Elle Winter also opening on selected dates.

Tour dates

References

2019 concert tours